Paulo José Rocha Baldroegas (born 2 December 1954 in Barreiro, Setúbal District), known as Rocha, is a Portuguese retired footballer who played as a midfielder.

External links

1954 births
Living people
Sportspeople from Barreiro, Portugal
Portuguese footballers
Association football midfielders
Primeira Liga players
Liga Portugal 2 players
Sporting CP footballers
S.C. Braga players
Portimonense S.C. players
G.D. Chaves players
C.D. Trofense players
Portugal international footballers